Condoroma District is one of eight districts of the province Espinar in Peru.

Geography 
Some of the highest mountains of the district are listed below:

Ethnic groups 
The people in the district are mainly indigenous citizens of Quechua descent. Quechua is the language which the majority of the population (86.26%) learnt to speak in childhood, 13.56% of the residents started speaking using the Spanish language (2007 Peru Census).

References